Francisco Alvarado is a noted playwright of zarzuela in Lineyte-Samarnon (Waray). He was a member and literary luminary of the Sanghiran san Binisaya organization which was founded in 1909 to cultivate the Waray language.

Poetry
Panhayhay hin Bungtohanon, 1921, Hinagpis ng Isang Taga-Bayan
An Marol, 1925, Ang Sampagita
Kaadlawon, 1925, Araw
Kagab-ihon, 1925, Gabi
Nihaga, 1930
Pilipinas, 1931

Anthologies
 Panulaan At Dulaang Leytenhon-Samarnon
 Jaime Biron Polo, Editor and translator
 Ateneo de Manila University Press, 1994

References
 www.bisaya.com Visayan Literature page—defunct

Visayan writers
Waray-language writers
Filipino writers